The 2018–19 Rhode Island Rams basketball team represented the University of Rhode Island during the 2018–19 NCAA Division I men's basketball season. The Rams, led by first-year head coach David Cox, played their home games at the Ryan Center in Kingston, Rhode Island as members of the Atlantic 10 Conference. They finished the season 18-15, 9-9 in A-10 Play to finish in 8th place. They defeated La Salle And VCU to advance to the semifinals of the A-10 tournament where they lost to St. Bonaventure.

Previous season
The Rams finished the 2017–18 season 26–8, 15–3 in A-10 play to finish win the A-10 regular season championship. They defeated VCU and Saint Joseph's to advance to the championship game of the A-10 tournament where they lost to Davidson. They received an at-large bid to the NCAA tournament where they defeated Oklahoma in the first round before losing in the second round to Duke.

On March 22, 2018, it was announced that head coach Dan Hurley had accepted the head coaching job at Connecticut. On April 4, assistant coach David Cox was promoted to head coach.

Offseason

Departures

2018 recruiting class

Roster

Schedule and results

|-
!colspan=9 style=|Exhibition

|-
!colspan=9 style=| Non-conference regular season

|-
!colspan=12 style=| Atlantic 10 regular season

|-
!colspan=9 style=| Atlantic 10 tournament

Source

See also
 2018–19 Rhode Island Rams women's basketball team

References

Rhode Island Rams men's basketball seasons
Rhode Island